Birgunj Television (commercially abbreviated as BTV) is a small-scale television channel, that is the first ever television channel of Birgunj. It was started in 2013 but was officially released in 2014. It was started with small capital, TV shows and few staffs. Hemant Tamang is known as the prominent producer of BTV.

Overview

BTV basically serves to provide the overall information of Birgunj. It hosts TV shows relevant to the news and condition of Birgunj, peoples' views about the status of Birgunj, notable persons as well as some comedy programmes irrelevant to Birgunj.

The programmes on BTV use simple camera-host style i.e. a cameraman with the programme host(s). BTV has not been able to generate much profit and has been hosting only few ads of companies like Jagadamba and institutions like Birgunj Public College.

TV Shows
BTV hosts only a few number of programmes. This list may be incomplete.

Walk & Talk
Chalte Chalte
Hashi ke Tadke
Hot talk
Music & More
SMS Pool

Walk & Talk and Chalte Chalte ( Walk & Talk—Nepali, Chalte Chalte—Bhojpuri) are programmes where the hosts travel Birgunj and talk with people about a certain event. Hashi ke Tadke (English: Waves of Laughter) is a comedy show in Bhojpuri, hosted by a boy and a girl in a studio.

Hot talk features the interview or talking with notable persons or organizations of Birgunj. Music & More is a show that provides information of various song albums and their singers. SMS Pool is based on Facebook	 messages. Anyone can send messages in their thread and the messages are publicly spoken/displayed. Almost every programme-breaks are followed by a video song. Sometimes, films are also shown on BTV.

Response

BTV got a good response from viewers. During the end of 2014, it gained a good popularity. Despite of not having generated a good profit, it is spreading its broadcast almost all over Nepal.

See also

Kantipur Television
Nepal Television

Notes

Television channels in Nepal
2014 establishments in Nepal